Again and Again is the second studio album by electronic music group Thieves Like Us.

References 

2010 albums